Jim Yorke (born 29 February 1976), known professionally as Jim York, is a New Zealand professional mixed martial artist who has fought for the World Victory Road, Impact FC and King of the Cage promotions.

York is best known for his fights with Japanese firebrand Yoshihiro Nakao and UFC vet Dave Herman. He also fought EliteXC and PRIDE FC veteran James Thompson at World Victory Road Presents: Sengoku 7 winning via knockout.

Mixed martial arts record

|-
|Win
|align=center|16–5
|Steven Warby
| Decision (unanimous) 
| Nitro MMA 10
|
|align=center|3
|align=center|5:00
|Logan City, Australia
|Won the vacant Nitro MMA Heavyweight Championship.
|-
|Loss
|align=center|15–5
|Jeff Monson
| Decision (unanimous) 
| Cage Fighting Championship 21
|
|align=center|3
|align=center|5:00
|Sydney, Australia
|
|-
|Win
|align=center|15–4
|Lucas Browne
| TKO (punches)
| XMMA 3
|
|align=center|2
|align=center|N/A
|Sydney, Australia
|
|-
|Win
|align=center|14–4
|Felise Leniu
| Submission (rear-naked choke)
| XMMA 2: ANZ vs. USA
|
|align=center|1
|align=center|1:27
|Sydney, Australia
|
|-
|Win
|align=center|13–4
|Peter Graham
| Submission (rear-naked choke)
| Impact FC 2
|
|align=center|1
|align=center|3:44
|Sydney, Australia
|
|-
|Win
|align=center|12–4
|Brandon Cash
| TKO (submission to punches)
| Cage Fighting Championships 14
|
|align=center|1
|align=center|4:33
|Sydney, Australia
|
|-
|Loss
|align=center|11–4
|Dave Herman
| KO (axe kicks and punches)
| World Victory Road Presents: Sengoku 11
|
|align=center|1
|align=center|2:25
|Tokyo, Japan
|
|-
|Loss
|align=center|11–3
|Antônio Silva
| Submission (arm-triangle choke)
| World Victory Road Presents: Sengoku 10
|
|align=center|1
|align=center|3:51
|Saitama, Japan
|
|-
|Win
|align=center|11–2
|James Thompson
| KO (punch)
| World Victory Road Presents: Sengoku 7
|
|align=center|1
|align=center|4:33
|Tokyo, Japan
|
|-
|Loss
|align=center|10–2
|NakaoYoshihiro Nakao
| KO (punches) 
| World Victory Road Presents: Sengoku 2
|
|align=center|2
|align=center|0:46
|Tokyo, Japan
|
|-
|Win
|align=center|10–1
|ZekiIro Zeki
| TKO (punches) 
| MARS 7: Tornado Returns
|
|align=center|1
|align=center|0:46
|Tokyo, Japan
|
|-
|Win
|align=center|9–1
|KaplanAnthony Netzler 
| KO (punch) 
| MARS 4: New Deal
|
|align=center|1
|align=center|1:03
|Tokyo, Japan
|
|-
|Win
|align=center|8–1
|Jun Soo Lim
| Submission (neck crank) 
| MARS World Grand Prix
|
|align=center|1
|align=center|1:56
|Seoul, South Korea
|
|-
|Win
|align=center|7–1
|MorrisBrad Morris
| KO (head kick)
| KOTC: Gunfather
|
|align=center|3
|align=center|2:59
|Sunshine Coast, Australia
|
|-
|Win
|align=center|6–1
|BertoniDarren Bertoni 
| TKO (submission to punches)
|Dojo KO: First Elimination
|
|align=center|1
|align=center|N/A
|Gold Coast, Australia
|
|-
|Win
|align=center|5–1
|CutajarMick Cutajar 
| Submission (verbal)
|Warriors Realm 2
|
|align=center|1
|align=center|0:59
|Sunshine Coast, Australia
|
|-
|Win
|align=center|4–1
|DistantShane Distant 
| Submission (kimura)	 
|Spartan Reality Fight 12
|
|align=center|1
|align=center|1:45
|Gold Coast, Australia
|
|-
|Win
|align=center|3–1
|HendersonGareth Henderson  
| Submission (rear-naked choke)
| Warriors Realm 1
|
|align=center|1
|align=center|1:48
|Sunshine Coast, Australia
|
|-
|Win
|align=center|2–1
|HeinsSean Heins 
| TKO (injury)
|Spartan Reality Fight 9
|
|align=center|1
|align=center|0:49
|Queensland, Australia
|
|-
|Win
|align=center|1–1
|WhiteNathan White 
| Submission (guillotine choke)
|Spartan Reality Fight 8
|
|align=center|1
|align=center|0:57
|Gold Coast, Australia
|
|-
|Loss
|align=center|0–1
|MeijerDoug Meijer 
| Submission (rear-naked choke)
|Spartan Reality Fight 7
|
|align=center|2
|align=center|0:41
|Queensland, Australia
|

External links
Professional MMA record for Jim York from Sherdog

References

1976 births
Living people
New Zealand male mixed martial artists
Heavyweight mixed martial artists
Mixed martial artists utilizing boxing
Mixed martial artists utilizing wrestling
Sportspeople from Invercargill
New Zealand expatriate sportspeople in Australia
New Zealand wrestlers
Australian male mixed martial artists